This is a list of the St. George Illawarra Dragons honours since their formation in 1999. They have won one premiership, one World Cub Challenge and two minor premierships, amongst other team and individual honours. The Dragons were formed by the merger of the St. George Dragons and the Illawarra Steelers. The honours of their predecessors aren’t counted in this list.

Men's team honours

Premierships (1)
St. George Illawarra Dragons have won one Grand Final out of 2 attempts. Meanwhile, their predecessors St. George won 15 while Illawarra won 0.

Runners-up (1)

Minor Premierships (2)
St. George Illawarra Dragons finished first in 2009 and 2010 to claim consecutive minor premierships.

Finals Appearances (12)
1999, 2001, 2002, 2004, 2005, 2006, 2008, 2009, 2010, 2011, 2015 and 2018

World Club Challenge (1)

NRL Nines

Runners-up (1)

Women's team honours

Runners-up (1)

NRL Nines

Champions (1)

Reserves honours 
NSW Cup (2) - 2001, 2016

Jersey Flegg Cup (1) - 2005

S.G. Ball Cup (1) - 2019 (Illawarra)

Individual competition honours

Dally M Medal

Dally M Fullback of the Year

Dally M Winger of the Year

Dally M Centre of the Year

Dally M Five-Eighth of the Year

Dally M Lock of the Year

Dally M Prop of the Year

Ken Irvine Medal

Clive Churchill Medal

Provan-Summons Medal

NYC Player of the Year

Individual club honours

Player of the Year

References 

Honours
Rugby league trophies and awards
National Rugby League lists
Sydney-sport-related lists